The 2010 Samoa Cup was the first edition of the Samoa Cup, a domestic cup played by the teams of the year's Samoa National League participants. This cup was won by  Kiwi FC for the first time, winning over runners-up Moaula FC 3–1 in the overall final.

References 

Samoa Cup